Esfanjan may refer to:
 Esfanjan, East Azerbaijan
 Esfanjan, Fars